Predestination is the Christian teaching that all events have been willed by God. Predestination may also refer to:
 Predestination in Islam
 Predestination (film), a 2014 Australian film